The Lower Peninsula of Michigan – also known as Lower Michigan – is the larger, southern and less elevated of the two major landmasses that make up the U.S. state of Michigan; the other being the Upper Peninsula, which is separated by the Straits of Mackinac. It is surrounded by water on all sides except its southern border, which it shares with Indiana and Ohio. Although the Upper Peninsula is commonly referred to as "the U.P.", it is uncommon for the Lower Peninsula to be called "the L.P."

Because of its recognizable shape, the Lower Peninsula is nicknamed "the mitten", with the eastern region identified as "The Thumb". This has led to several folkloric creation myths for the area, one being that it is a handprint of Paul Bunyan, a giant lumberjack and popular European-American folk character in Michigan. When asked where they live, Lower Peninsula residents may hold up their right palm and point to a spot on it to indicate the location.

The peninsula is sometimes divided into the Northern Lower Peninsula—which is more sparsely populated and largely forested—and the Southern Lower Peninsula—which is largely urban or farmland. Southern Lower Michigan is sometimes further divided into economic and cultural subregions.

The more culturally and economically diverse Lower Peninsula dominates Michigan politics, and maps of it without the Upper Peninsula are sometimes mistakenly presented as "Michigan", which contributes to resentment by "Yoopers" (residents of "the U.P"). Yoopers jokingly refer to residents of the Lower Peninsula as "flat-landers" (referring to the region's less rugged terrain) or "trolls" (because, being south of the Mackinac Bridge, they "live under the bridge").

Geography

The Lower Peninsula is bounded on the west by Lake Michigan and on the northeast by Lake Huron, which connect at the Straits of Mackinac. In the southeast, the waterway consisting of the St. Clair River, Lake St. Clair, Detroit River, and Lake Erie separates it from the province of Ontario, Canada. It is bounded on the south by the states of Indiana and Ohio. This border is irregular: the border with Indiana was moved 10 miles northward from its territorial position to give Indiana more access to Lake Michigan, and its slightly angled border with Ohio was part of the compromise which ended the Toledo War. The Lower Peninsula is a part of the Great Lakes Plain, which include large parts of Wisconsin and Ohio.

It contains nearly two-thirds of Michigan's total land area. The surface of the peninsula is generally level, broken by conical hills and glacial moraines usually not more than a few hundred feet tall, most common in the north. The western coast features extensive sandy beaches and dunes produced by Lake Michigan and the prevailing winds from the west. The relatively shallow Saginaw Bay is surrounded by a similarly shallow drainage basin. Several large river systems flow into the adjacent Great Lakes, including the Kalamazoo, Grand, Muskegon, and Manistee rivers (Lake Michigan), and the Au Sable and Tittabawassee–Shiawassee–Saginaw rivers (Lake Huron).

Flora and fauna

The American Bird Conservancy and the National Audubon Society have designated several locations as internationally Important Bird Areas.

Geology

The Lower Peninsula is dominated by a geological basin known as the Michigan Basin. That feature is represented by a nearly circular pattern of geologic sedimentary strata in the area with a nearly uniform structural dip toward the center of the peninsula. Around the margins, such as under Mackinaw City, Michigan, the Precambrian surface is around  down. This  contour on the bedrock clips the northern part of the lower peninsula and continues under Lake Michigan along the west. It crosses the southern counties of Michigan and continues on to the north beneath Lake Huron.

Climate 
Most monthly temperatures in the lower peninsula range from a low of 14 degrees to a high of 84 degrees Fahrenheit.

Transportation

Major airports
 Alpena County Regional Airport (APN) (Alpena)
 Bishop International Airport (FNT) (Flint)
 Capital Region International Airport (LAN) (Lansing)
 Cherry Capital Airport (TVC) (Traverse City)
 Detroit Metropolitan Wayne County Airport (DTW) (Romulus)
 Gerald R. Ford International Airport (GRR) (Grand Rapids)
 Kalamazoo/Battle Creek International Airport (AZO) (Kalamazoo)
 MBS International Airport (MBS) (Saginaw)
 Pellston Regional Airport (PLN) (Pellston)

Highways
Interstate Highways in the region include:
 
 
 
 

U.S. Highways in the region include:
 
 
 
 
 
 
 
 

The Great Lakes Circle Tour is a designated scenic road system connecting all of the Great Lakes and the St. Lawrence River.

Regions

Michigan's Lower Peninsula can be divided into four main regions based on geological, soil, and vegetation differences; amount of urban areas or rural areas; minority populations; and agriculture. The four principal regions listed below can further be separated into sub-regions and overlapping areas.
Northern Michigan
Central/Mid-Michigan
The Thumb
Tri-Cities
Southern Michigan
West Michigan
Southern Michigan
Michiana
Southeast Michigan
Metro Detroit

See also

List of counties in Michigan

Notes

External links

 Clarke Historical Library, Central Michigan University, Bibliography on Michigan (arranged by counties and regions)
 Michigan Geology -- Clarke Historical Library, Central Michigan University
 Michigan Department of Natural Resources website, harbors, hunting, resources and more
 Info Michigan, detailed information on 630 cities
 List of Museums, other attractions compiled by state government
 Michigan's Official Economic Development and Travel Site
 
 Map of Michigan Lighthouse in PDF Format
 Northern Michigan Live Streaming Webcam
 Terry Pepper on lighthouses of the Western Great Lakes

Peninsulas of Michigan
Regions of Michigan